The Buffalo and Pittsburgh Railroad  is a Class II railroad operating in New York and Pennsylvania.

The BPRR is owned by Genesee & Wyoming. Its main line runs between Buffalo, New York, and Eidenau, Pennsylvania, north of Pittsburgh. Here, connections are made to the city center via the Allegheny Valley Railroad. The system runs largely on former Baltimore & Ohio (B&O) lines.

Major commodities carried include paper, petroleum products, chemicals, coal, steel, and sand.

Main line
The Buffalo-Eidenau main line passes through Salamanca, NY, Bradford, PA, Johnsonburg, PA, DuBois, PA, Punxsutawney, PA, and Butler, PA. Principal rail yards are located at Butler, Punxsutawney (Riker), and Buffalo, with support yards for local industry at other locations.

B&P initially used the direct former B&O/BR&P main between Buffalo and Salamanca, but during the 1990s a failing bridge at Springville, New York forced the railroad to detour its trains north of Ashford Junction via the former Rochester & Southern track to Machias Junction, New York, thence north on Conrail's/Norfolk Southern's ex-Pennsylvania Railroad Buffalo Line to Buffalo. Buffalo & Pittsburgh now is the sole user of the ex-PRR south of CP-GRAVITY in Buffalo.

Other lines
BPRR operates two key secondary lines. One runs between Erie and Johnsonburg along the former Allegheny & Eastern Railroad. Another is made up of former Pittsburg & Shawmut Railroad tracks, running from the Armstrong Power Plant in Reesedale to Freeport, Pennsylvania.  The B&P also operates on the Low Grade between DuBois and Driftwood that was formerly used by the Pennsylvania Railroad, then Conrail. A portion of the former B&O Northern Subdivision is used to provide access to Petrolia, PA.

CSX Transportation also leases the P&W Subdivision to the B&P between Allison Park and the New Castle Yard in West Pittsburg, just outside New Castle, PA. Though the B&P ends in Allison Park, the railroad rarely traverses the line down to the borough.  Instead, it transfers its goods to the AVR either in Evans City or Bakerstown depending on the amount of freight it has.  Other owned and operated branch lines travel to Homer City, St Marys, and Brookville, Pennsylvania, as well as to the Buffalo suburb of Orchard Park, New York.

History

Operations began in 1988 over mostly former Baltimore & Ohio Railroad (formerly Buffalo, Rochester and Pittsburgh Railway) lines. In the early 2000s, the BPRR merged other GWI railroads into it.  These lines include the Allegheny & Eastern Railroad (ALY), Pittsburg & Shawmut Railroad (PSR), and the Bradford Industrial Railroad (BR).

Around 2005 the Indiana Subdivision, which had been out of use, was rehabilitated to serve the Homer City Generating Station. Shortly after this, the Ridge Subdivision, which had seen a Norfolk Southern coal train run-through to Shelocta was sold off to NS.  In 2006, the railroad was honored as the Regional Railroad of the Year by Railway Age magazine.

Fleet
The BPRR fleet, as of November 2020, consists of the following. Almost all locomotives were manufactured by EMD between the late 1950s and early 1970s.

References

External links 

Buffalo & Pittsburgh Railroad

Transportation in Buffalo, New York
New York (state) railroads
Pennsylvania railroads
Regional railroads in the United States
Genesee & Wyoming
Spin-offs of CSX Transportation